Advanced Intelligent Systems is a monthly peer-reviewed open access scientific journal covering research on artificial systems that recognize, process, and respond to stimuli/instructions and learn from experience, including robotics, automation, artificial intelligence and machine learning, the human-machine interface, control theory and systems, smart and responsive materials, smart sensing systems, and programmed self-assembly. According to the Journal Citation Reports, the journal has a 2021 impact factor of 7.298.

Abstracting and indexing
The journal is abstracted and indexed in:
Ei Compendex
Current Contents/ Engineering, Computing & Technology
Inspec

Science Citation Index Expanded

References

External links

Engineering journals
English-language journals
Monthly journals
Wiley-VCH academic journals
Publications established in 2019